HMS Cambridge was a 70-gun third-rate ship of the line of the Royal Navy, launched in 1666 at Deptford Dockyard.

Cambridge was wrecked in 1694.

Notes

References

Lavery, Brian (2003) The Ship of the Line - Volume 1: The development of the battlefleet 1650-1850. Conway Maritime Press. .
 

Ships of the line of the Royal Navy
1660s ships